WRLN (105.3 FM) is a radio station licensed to serve Red Lake, Minnesota and the surrounding areas. The station is owned by Red Lake Nation, a Native American-run nonprofit organization. It airs a variety of music, talk and community programming, much of which is native-oriented.

History
WRLN Red Lake's first radio station signed on the air at 105.3 FM with 100,000 watts of power on February 1, 2022, and airs a multi-format station playing almost all genres of music of different formats including country, rock, pop, pow-wow, and more. The station also provides news stories, local weather updates and sports information to allow listeners know what is going on in the community.

The station can be found at 105.3 on your FM radio and on Paul Bunyan Television Service "PBTV" channel 960 or PBTV Fusion channel 1060.

See also
List of community radio stations in the United States

References

External links

Radio stations in Minnesota
Community radio stations in the United States
Native American radio
Radio stations established in 2022
2022 establishments in Minnesota